Flautista! (subtitled Herbie Mann Plays Afro Cuban Jazz) is a live album by American jazz flautist Herbie Mann recorded in 1959 for the Verve label.

Reception

AllMusic awarded the album 4 stars stating " Flautista!, recorded live at New York City's Basin Street East in June 1959, captures the flutist's deepening immersion in global rhythms and harmonies, documenting a pan-cultural jazz aesthetic that points the way for the myriad world music efforts that followed in its wake".

Track listing
All compositions by Herbie Mann except as indicated
 "Todos Locos" - 5:35
 "Cuban Patato Chip" - 7:45
 "Come on, Mule" - 7:18
 "The Amazon River" - 8:35
 "Caravan" (Juan Tizol) - 9:46
 "Delilah" (Victor Young) - 6:06 Bonus track on CD reissue
 "Basin Street Este"  - 5:12 Bonus track on CD reissue

Personnel 
Herbie Mann - flute, bass clarinet
Johnny Rae - vibraphone, marimba
Knobby Totah - bass
Santo Miranda - drums, percussion
Carlos "Patato" Valdes - congas, percussion
José Luis Mangual - bongos, percussion

References 

1959 live albums
Herbie Mann live albums
Albums produced by Norman Granz
Verve Records live albums
Albums recorded at Basin Street East